DXKR may refer to the two radio stations with the same callsign. They are: 
 DXKR-FM, a radio station in Davao, owned by ACWS-UBN and operated by UM Broadcasting Network, branded as Retro 95.5
 DXKR-AM, a radio station in Koronadal, Owned by Radio Mindanao Network, branded as RMN Koronadal